Operation Miracle was an operation of the Republic of Korea Armed Forces to evacuate Afghan collaborators from Afghanistan after the fall of Kabul, the capital city, to the Taliban. Three C-130J were used for evacuation, and 390 personnel were evacuated.

Background 

Since early August, South Korea Ministry of National Defense planned to evacuate Afghan collaborators. After Kabul, the capital of Afghanistan had fallen to the Taliban during 2021 Taliban offensive, South Korean government evacuated its local residents and officials and made temporary official residence in Qatar in August 17. As planning operation, related departure and military units kept the operation confidential to secure the safety of Afghan people.

Timeline

References

See also 
 Operation Allies Refuge – American rescue operation 
 Operation Pitting – British concurrent rescue operation 
 Operation Devi Shakti – Indian concurrent rescue operation 
 Hungnam evacuation

Humanitarian military operations
Non-combat military operations involving South Korea
2021 in South Korea
Airlifts
2021 in aviation
Afghanistan–South Korea relations